The Hosseinieh Ershad or Hosseiniyeh Ershad is a non-traditionalist religious institute established by Nasser Minachi in Tehran, Iran. It was closed for a time by the Pahlavi government in 1972.  The institute is housed in a large, domed hall, and is used for lectures on history, culture, society, and religion. The facility also includes a large public library, where most of its users are college students.

Ali Shariati held his anti-Pahlavi speeches here before the revolution.  Mir-Hossein Mousavi (under the pseudonym Hossein Rah'jo) and Zahra Rahnavard exhibited artwork here during the same period.

Public speakers 
 Ali Shariati
 Morteza Motahari
 Fakhreddin Hejazi
 Reza Esfahani

See also
 Hussainia

References

External links

 Photograph of Hosseiniye Ershad

Buildings and structures in Tehran
Architecture in Iran
Religion in Iran
Culture in Tehran